Margit Carstensen (born 29 February 1940) is a German theatre and film actress, best known outside Germany for roles in the works of film director Rainer Werner Fassbinder.

Theater career
Carstensen, the daughter of a physician, was born and raised in the north-German city of Kiel. Upon graduation from the local high school in 1958, she studied acting at the Hochschule für Musik und Theater Hamburg. This education led to her first stage appearances in Kleve, Heilbronn, Münster and Braunschweig. In 1965 Margit Carstensen received a four-year engagement with the Deutsches Schauspielhaus (German Playhouse) in Hamburg. There she played leading roles in plays by John Osborne and the classical Spanish playwright Lope de Vega.

In 1969 she gained a local profile for her work in the Theater am Goetheplatz in Bremen, where she first met director Rainer Werner Fassbinder. She then worked under his direction in a comedy by the 18th-century Venetian Carlo Goldoni The Coffee Shop (which was recorded for television in 1970), bringing her national attention in West Germany. She subsequently played the role of serial murderess Geesche Gottfried in the premiere of Fassbinder’s own play Bremen Freedom (also televised, in 1972), and then in the title role of his Henrik Ibsen adaptation Nora Helmer (televised in 1974) derived from A Doll's House.

From 1973 to 1976 Carstensen held a steady acting engagement in Darmstadt, and the next year worked once again in Hamburg. In 1977 she moved to what was then West Berlin where she performed on the highly regarded Staatliche Schauspielbühnen. In 1982 she moved to Stuttgart in order to work with director Hansgünther Heyme, where she appeared in a series of plays directed by him. Over the years she also performed in many smaller roles on the most important of the German-language stages, for example making several appearances in the Munich Kammerspiele.

By the late 1980s she had developed ongoing working relationships with the German directors Werner Schroeter, Christoph Schlingensief and Leander Haußmann. In 1995 she followed Haußmann to Bochum, in order to work with him there. For the 2003–04 season, Carstensen appeared in the Vienna Burgtheater, in the premiere of Elfriede Jelinek’s play Bambiland under the direction of Schlingensief.

In 2008 she appeared in the Schauspielhaus Bochum (Playhouse Bochum), in Shakespeare's As You Like It.

Film and television
Carstensen is best known outside Germany for the many film and television productions of Rainer Werner Fassbinder in which she participated. She played leading roles in the Fassbinder films The Bitter Tears of Petra von Kant (1972), her best-known role for Fassbinder; Martha (1974), with Karlheinz Böhm, analysing a traditional marriage in a contemporary setting; Fear of Fear (1975); Mother Küsters' Trip to Heaven (1975); Satan's Brew (1976); Chinese Roulette (1976) and Women in New York (1977). She also appeared in individual episodes of two Fassbinder television productions: Eight Hours Don't Make a Day (1972), and Berlin Alexanderplatz (1980).

Carstensen also worked in international productions. In the fifth film made by Polish director Andrzej Żuławski, Possession (1981), a French-German coproduction, she performed together with Isabelle Adjani, Sam Neill and Heinz Bennent. Four years later she worked with Polish-born director Agnieszka Holland on her film Angry Harvest (1985), together with Armin Mueller-Stahl. This film was nominated for an Academy Award for Best Foreign Language Film.

Her artistic collaboration with director Christoph Schlingensief began with two of his film projects. In his 100 Years of Adolf Hitler: The Last Hour in the Führerbunker (1989), she played the part of Magda Goebbels. In his satirical political spoof Terror 2000: Germany Out of Control (1992), she played the role of a detective.

Carstensen has appeared in films by directors such as Leander Haußmann (Sonnenallee, 1999); Romuald Karmakar (Manila, 2000); Chris Kraus (Scherbentanz, 2002, a role for which she won the Bavarian Film Award for Best Actress); Oskar Roehler (Agnes and His Brothers, 2004) and Detlev Buck (Hands off Mississippi, 2007).

During the 2007–08 season Carstensen assisted with the Austrian-German TV documentary Mr. Karl – A Person for People, directed by Kurt Mayer.

Awards
Margit Carstensen has received many awards in her career. Among these are the 1973 German Film Awards (Gold), for her acting in The Bitter Tears of Petra von Kant, and the 2002 Bavarian Film Award, for her acting in Scherbentanz. In 1972 she was chosen by the German Film Critics Guild as Best Actress of the Year.

Filmography

 (1970, TV film, based on a play by Carlo Goldoni), as Vittoria
 (1970, TV film), as Margarete
Die Ahnfrau – Oratorium nach Franz Grillparzer (1971, TV film, based on a play by Franz Grillparzer), as Berta
The Bitter Tears of Petra von Kant (1972), as Petra von Kant
 (1972, TV film), as Geesche Gottfried
Eight Hours Don't Make a Day: Oma und Gregor (1972, TV), as Housewife
The Tenderness of Wolves (1973), as Mrs. Lindner
World on a Wire (1973, TV film, based on the novel Simulacron-3), as Maya Schmidt-Gentner
 (1974, TV film, based on the play A Doll's House), as Nora Helmer
Martha (1974, TV film, based on a story by Cornell Woolrich), as Martha
Mother Küsters' Trip to Heaven (1975), as Marianne Thälmann
Fear of Fear (1975, TV film), as Margot
Satan's Brew (1976), as Andrée
Chinese Roulette (1976), as Ariane Christ
Adolf and Marlene (1977), as Marlene
 (1977, TV film, based on the play The Women), as Sylvia Fowler
 (1978), as Miss Rosner
The Third Generation (1979), as Petra Vielhaber
 (1979, TV film), as Mrs. Lukaschewski
Berlin Alexanderplatz: Epilogue (1980, TV series, based on the novel Berlin Alexanderplatz), as Terah, Angel
Possession (1981), as Margit Gluckmeister
The Council of Love (1982, based on a play by Oskar Panizza), as Prosecutor
The Roaring Fifties (1983, based on a novel by Johannes Mario Simmel), as Secretary
An Ideal Husband (1984, TV film, based on the play An Ideal Husband), as Lady Markby
Emilia Galotti (1984, TV film, based on the play Emilia Galotti), as Countess Orsina
Angry Harvest (1985), as Eugenia
Half of Love ( La Moitié de l'amour, 1985)
100 Years of Adolf Hitler: The Last Hour in the Führerbunker (1989), as Magda Goebbels
Underground (1989, TV film), as Krista/Tina
Derrick (1991, TV series, episode "Wer bist du, Vater?"/"Who are you, Father?"), as Mrs. Hauser
Terror 2000: Germany Out of Control (1992), as Margret
Anwalt Abel (1997, TV series, episode "Das schmutzige Dutzend"), as Mrs. Nussbauer
Gesche's Poison (1997), as Mrs. Timm
 (1997), as Margit
Rider of the Flames (1998), as Mrs. von Proeck
Sonnenallee (1999), as Direktorin
John Gabriel Borkman (2000, TV film, based on the play John Gabriel Borkman), as Gunhild Borkman
 (2000), as Regine Görler
The Fool and His Wife This Evening in Pancomedia (2002, TV film, based on a play by Botho Strauß)
 (2002), as Käthe
Agnes and His Brothers (2004), as Roxy
The Captain from Köpenick (2005, TV film, based on the play The Captain of Köpenick), as Marie Hoprecht
It Is Fine! Everything Is Fine. (2007), as Linda Barnes
 (2007), as Mrs. Strietzel
Mr. Karl – A Person for People (2008, TV documentary)
 (2009, TV film)
Finsterworld (2013), as Mrs. Sandberg
Tatort (2016, TV series, episode "Wofür es sich zu leben lohnt"), as Margarethe Weißkopf

References

External links
Margit Carstensen in the Internet Movie Database

1940 births
Living people
Actors from Kiel
German film actresses
German stage actresses
Best Actress German Film Award winners
Hochschule für Musik und Theater Hamburg alumni
20th-century German actresses
21st-century German actresses
German television actresses